Paul Maybury (born 1982 in Boston) is an American comic book creator living in Austin, Texas.

Biography
Paul Maybury is an American comic book creator living in Austin Texas. Notable works include, Aqua Leung, Catalyst Comix, Blue Estate, Marvel Strange Tales and Sovereign.

Bibliography

Comics
 Elks Run #2: "All the wrong choices" (with writers Chris Fabulous and Jason Rodriquez, for Hoarse and Buggy, 2005)
 24seven: "Things Run Amuck" (with writer Mark Andrew Smith, Image Comics, 2006)
 The Wicked West 2: "A Man With A Stake In His Hand" (artist,writer Image Comics, 2006)
 Put the book back on the shelf: "Ninja No!" (with writer Mark Andrew Smith, Image Comics, 2006)
 24seven volume 2: "Give Me Some Colour" (artist,writer Image Comics, 2007)
 Popgun: "Aqua Leung, Ambush" (with writer Mark Andrew Smith, Image Comics, 2007)
 Aqua Leung (with writer Mark Andrew Smith, graphic novel, for Image Comics, 2008)
 Popgun 2: "Prey On You" (writer/colorist with artist Nikki Cook, Image Comics, 2008)
 Popgun 2: "Little Known Fact" (with writer Benito Cereno, Image Comics, 2008)
 Comic Book Tattoo: "Crucify" (artist,writer Image Comics, 2008)
 Crack Comics: "The Clock Strikes", anthology for Image Comics, 2009)
 Blue Estate (with writer Viktor Kalvachev, three issues, for Image Comics, 2010)
 Eat That Frog: (with writers Cullen Bunn & Brian Tracy, graphic novel for Smarter Comics, 2011)
 D.O.G.S. of Mars: (with writers Tony Trov, Johnny Zito & Christian Weiser, graphic novel for Image Comics, 2012)
 Twisted Savage Dragon Funnies: "Wrong Turn" (with artist Giannis Milogiannis, anthology for Image Comics, 2012)
 Spera Volume 2: "Secrets", anthology for Image Comics, 2012)
 Atomic Robo: Real Science Adventures: (with writer Brian Clevinger, anthology for Red 5 Comics, 2013)
 Catalyst Comix (with writer Joe Casey, nine issue maxi series, for Dark Horse Comics, 2013-2014)
 Sovereign (with writer Chris Roberson, ongoing series, for Image Comics, 2014–present)
 Valhalla Mad (with writer Joe Casey, ongoing series, for Image Comics, 2015)

Web comics
 Party Bear (artist/writer, ACT-I-VATE, 2006-2007)
 Adventures of Maxy J. Millionaire (artist/writer, Zuda, 2007)

Illustrations
Paul Maybury has contributed illustrations to the following projects
 Winter Survival Guide, Columbus day special cover and 2006 Election special and  various others for The Weekly Dig
 All Tomorrow's Parties Criterion Collection

Awards
 Association of Alternative Newsweeklies Award: Best Editorial Layout, Weekly Dig ("Slumber Party") (2007)

External links

Out of Step Arts

Interviews
Up and coming Newsarama interview
Newsarama interview on Aqua Leung
Dick Hyacinth interview on Aqua Leung
CBR interview on Aqua Leung
2005 Indie show
2008 Indie show
planetcomicbookradio interview
Weekly Dig interview
CBR commentary track
Comics Reporter interview
Comics Related interview
NYCC panel coverage

References

1982 births
Living people
American bloggers
American cartoonists
American comics artists
American comics writers
Artists from Boston
American webcomic creators